as the name suggests, is a creature with both human and fish-like features, described in various pieces of Japanese literature.

Though often translated as "mermaid", the term is technically not gender-specific and may include the "mermen". The literal translation "human-fish" has also been applied.

Overview  

The earliest records of the ningyo attested in written Japanese sources are freshwater beings allegedly captured in the 7th century (§Asuka period), documented later in the Nihon Shoki. But subsequent examples are usually seawater beings.

In later medieval times (§Kamakura and Muromachi periods)), it was held to be a sign of ill omen, and its beaching (§Omens in Michinoku) was blamed for subsequent bloody battles or calamity.

During the Edo period, the ningyo was made the subject of burlesque gesaku novels (cf. §Saikaku, 1687 and Santō Kyōden's §Hakoiri musume, 1791). There were also preserved ningyo being manufactured using fish parts (§Mummies or Feejee mermaids), and illustrated by some scholars of the period (e.g. §Baien gyofu); some such mummies are held by certain temples that have ningyo legend attached to them (cf. §Prince Shōtoku).

The description of the ningyo as having a red cockscomb (§Shokoku rijindan, and Saikaku) or light red hair (§Kasshi yawa) corroborates the hypothesis that oarfish sightings led to ningyo lore.

One giant ningyo was allegedly shot in 1805, even though it was held to be lucky, according to the news circulated in kawaraban pamphlet form (§Kairai)

Terminology 
The Japanese  has been glossed in a noted dictionary (Kojien) as a "fabulous creature" which is "half woman, half fish", later revised to "half human (usually woman) and half fish". Hence the term ningyo includes not just the mermaid but the merman also.

Accordingly, the ningyo is sometimes referred to by the verbatim translation "human-fish" in English-language scholarship, thus allowing for the gender ambiguity.

The term ningyo was not explicitly used in the earliest accounts (cf. §Asuka period, year 619) recorded in the Nihon shoki (720 AD). A later embellished account in 
 involving Prince Shōtoku claims that the Prince Regent knew the term ningyo, though this is regarded with skepticism. The term ningyo was likely absent from any of the primary sources used in compiling the Shoki, and nonexistent in the Japanese vocabulary during the Prince's time.

The term ningyo was also absent in medieval sources describing the Kamakura Period strandings in northern Japan §Omens in Michinoku) considered ominous. For example, a "large fish" washed ashore in the Hōji 1 (1247) according to 13th and 14th century texts. But these were called ningyo in a 17th-century recompilation.

Zoological hypotheses 

The earliest examples (cf. §Asuka period) were caught in fresh waters, and it has been hypothesized they must have actually been giant salamanders.

Another prominent theory is that the misidentification of the dugong led to mermaid lore, but detractors pointed out that the dugong's range reaches only as far north as Okinawa (formerly the Kingdom of Ryūkyū), and so was not likely to have been seen during premodern times in various locations in  Japan where mermaid legend (priestess who ate the mermaid) is known to occur. However, this argument is flawed, since there were other sea mammals of the Sirenia order,  namely Steller's sea cows which were native to the Bering Sea, and could have plausibly wandered into northern Japanese seas. Other sea mammals such as seals and dolphins are also candidates to have been mistaken for human-fish.

An inscribed wooden slat (mokkan) containing drawings of ningyo (13th century) suggest the actual animal captured may have been a pinniped, such as a seal (cf. §Ritual offering tablet).

The ichthyologist's hypothesis that the ningyo legend originated from sightings of the red-crested oarfish is bolstered by the lore or reports that the ningyo has red cockscomb (§Shokoku rijindan) or light red hair (§Kasshi yawa). This cockscomb also is mentioned in the novel by §Saikaku.

Iconography 
Despite the ningyo being defined as half-woman, half-fish in some modern dictionaries, the ningyo has been also depicted as having a human female head resting on a fish-like body, as in the well known Japanese woodblock print kawaraban pamphlet example (shown right, q.v. §Kairai).

The ningyo reportedly caught in the 7th century became associated with then Prince Regent Shōtōku, and the creature has been depicted as a gift presented to him in picture scrolls entitled Shōtōku Taishi eden, the oldest surviving copy of this (1069) being the earliest piece of ningyo art in Japan. There are multiple copies of the scrolls in existence. Also, much later in the 19th century. An example is the ningyo represented as a composite of the goddess Kannon and a fish (cf. §Prince Shōtoku and fig.).

The ningyo was human-headed in the 11th century anecdote involving the head of the Taira clan (cf. §Presented to Tadamori), The stranded ningyo had "four limbs" like a human or had hands and feet but was scaly and fish-headed. which were reported in Northern Japan in the 12th and 13th centuries and interpreted as omens (cf. §Omens in Michinoku) There has also been unearthed a wooden tablet with an illustration of such an ill-omened ningyo date to this period (c. 1286) (cf. )

But during the Edo period, illustrations of ningyo were varied, and in popular literature for entertainment (such as the kibyōshi genre), both human-headed fish type (armless) and half-human type with arms were illustrated (cf. §Two archetypes). One theory is that the two types derive from Classical Chinese literature, in particular the limbed  ("hill-fish") and the limbless  ("red ru fish") passed down from the ancient Shan hai jing ("Classic of Mountains and Seas") (cf. § Chinese lingyu and chiru).

Chinese literature 
However, this explanation is compromised by the fact that the Chinese "hill-fish" is considered four-limbed, and illustrated as such, whereas it was actually the Japanese work Wakan sansai zue (1712) which transformed the image of the Chinese "hill-fish" to  that of a two-armed legless one (cf. fig. right), while equating it with the Japanese ningyo. And this illustration has struck commentators as closely resembling the Western mermaid. (cf. § Ningyo in Wakan sansai zue) The Wakan sansai zue did also give notice and print the facsimile illustration of the merfolk pronounced Teijin in Japanese (Diren or in Chinese) mentioned in the classic Shan hai jing, which were indeed illustrated as two-armed merfolk in Chinese sources.

Also, what the yōkai wood-block print illustrator Toriyama Sekien drew (1781, fig. left) was not a Japanese ningyo but one dwelling in the far reaches of China west of a World tree (kenboku; pinyin: jianmu ). The caption adds that such ningyo was also known as the people of the Di Nation.

Siren-mermaids recorded by Europeans 
The Japanese Shogunate had acquired a copy of Johannes Jonston's Natural History in Dutch (1660) already by 1663, containing illustrations of the Western siren-mermaid. But it is not clear whether such "Dutch" (Rangaku, Western learning) images got widely disseminated in Japan before 's , which digested this and other works on the topic of mermaid, with reproduced illustrations.

By the late Edo Period (mid to late 19th century), the visual iconography of the ningyo came gradually to match the half-human half-fish of the European mermaid.

Yao Bikuni 
One of the most famous folk stories involving ningyo (or rather the flesh of the human-fish), purports that a girl who ate it acquired everlasting youth and longevity, and became the nun  also read Happyaku Bikuni, living to the age of 800 years.

Summary 
In the typical version the girl who ate the ningyo was from Obama, Wakasa Province, and as a nun dwelled in a  grass hut on the mountain at  temple in the region. She traveled all over Japan in her life, but then she resolves to end her life in her home country, and sealed herself in a cave where she dwelled or has herself buried alive on the mountain at the temple, and requests a camellia tree be planted at the site as indicator of whether she still remains alive.

In a version passed down at Obama, Wakasa, the sixteen-year-old girl eats the ningyo inadvertently, after her father receives the prepared dish as a guest, so that the family is not implicated in knowingly eating the ningyo or butchering it. The Kūin-ji temple history claims the father to have been a rich man named Takahashi, descended from the founder of the province, and when the daughter turned 16, the dragon king appeared in the guise of a white-bearded man and gave her the flesh as a gift. But there are versions known all over Japan, and the father is often identified as a fisherman. A fisherman reeled in the ningyo but discarded it due to its strangeness, but the young daughter had picked it up and eaten it, according to one telling.

Time period 
The oldest written sources of the legend date from the 15th century, and one of these sources relate that the  appeared in Kyoto in the middle of that century (year 1449) at age 800.

Assuming age 800 in keeping with her commonly used name, her birth can be back dated to around the mid-7th century, during the Asuka Period.

Folklorist 's chronology makes her a survivor from an even older age. He dated Yao Bikuni eating ningyo flesh in the year 480 AD during the Kofun Period (Tumulus Period). However, no written source for this could be evinced, according to a recent researcher, and an oral tradition is presumed.

Asuka period 

They were freshwater creatures, and the description of it being "childlike" suggested its true identity to be the Japanese giant salamander according to Minakata Kumagusu.

Prince Shōtoku 

Crown Prince Shōtoku at age 48 was allegedly was presented with a ningyo from Settsu Province, but he abhorred the unlucky gift and ordered it to be discarded immediately. This account occurs in a picture scroll called Shōtoku Taishi eden. There were some 40 copies of this made, of which the copy held by Hōryū-ji temple, dated to 1069 is the oldesg known pictorial depiction of the Japanese ningyo.

Shōtoku also knew the ningyo to bring forth disaster according to the Denryaku, and an annotation provides that it was customary for fishermen at the time to release a ningyo if ever caught in the net. When the prince was alarmed by the ill omen of a ningyo appearing in Ōmi Province, he had a statue of the Kannon goddess placed in the vicinity, according to document preserved at  temple.

Late Nara period 
After the Asuka Period, the two oldest appearances of the ningyo are dated to the mid- to late Nara Period, and these were situated by the sea.

Heian period

Presented to Tadamori 
(Ise Province. c. 1140s. In Kokon Chomonjū)

The event dates a century earlier than the anthology: when Taira no Tadamori (d. 1153; father of Kiyomori) had moved his residence to this place, populated by "bayside villagers" (fishermen).

The big fish had human-like heads (but also sets of fine teeth like fish, and a protruding mouths like a monkey's), with fish-like bodies. When hauled to land and carried (by pairs of fishermen) with the tails dragging, the creatures screamed in high-pitched voice and shed tears like a human. The tale concludes with the presumption that creatures must have been ningyo (human-fish). The three ningyo were presented to Tadamori, but one was returned to the bay's villagers (fishermen), who carved it up and ate it. It was exquisitely delicious, and no special effects came of it.

Kamakura and Muromachi periods

Omens in Michinoku 
(Mutsu and Dewa Provinces . Hōjō kudai ki, Azuma kagami, etc.)

 Bunji 5 (1189) summer. Presaging extermination of Fujiwara no Hidehira's sons 
 Kennin 3 (1203), 4th month. Tsugaru-no-ura. Minamoto no Sanetomo harmed by evil zen priest.
 Kenpo 1 (1213). Akita-no-ura, Dewa. Same year, .
 Hōji 1 (1247). 11th day of 3rd month. A fish-headed but human cadaver like fish. Tsugaru-no-ura. Same year, 's uprising (i.e., the ) {{Refn|name="azuma-kagami"|Azuma kagam 吾妻鏡 (Yoshikawa-bon) Book 36; (Hōjō-bon) Book 38, entry for Hōji 1, 29th of 5th month.}}）

Actually all these cases, culminating in the Hōji 1 event, were recorded in much older Azuma kagami (chronicle up to year 1266) and the Hōjō kudai ki (aka , 1331) except that the creature is not called a "ningyo" but rather a "large fish" (which was human cadaver-like with "four limbs"), or a creature "having hands and feet, covered in overlapping scales, and a head no different than a fish's". And these near-contemporary sources also interpret the ningyo ("big fish") appearances as presaging major warfare occurring within that year.

In Hōji 1, on the very same day (11th of 3rd month) when "big fish" was beached up north in Tsugaru, Michinoku (or perhaps the day preceding) the ocean by the Yuigahama (beach) was bright scarlet, and reported to have changed to blood. Yuigahama was the location of bloodshed on a number of occasion. The reason it may have indeed turned scarlet was possibly due to a red tide occurrence.)

The ningyo bones are remarkable medicine with the effect of stemming the flow of anal blood. The Europeans call it , and the Dutch sometimes carry it around"., Fig. 8 第八図, Fig. 14 第十四図.。

 Tsugaru domain 

The ningyo was reported captured in the Tsugaru Domain in the 17th and 18th centuries. In the latter case (given various years during the Hōreki era), ink drawings of the creature have been preserved, and is shown as wearing an apron-like kesa of Buddhist priests. Its capture was embellished into a tall tale, by way of linking it with the incident of an apprentice priest who was lost at sea a century before (explained further below).

The earlier record is that in Genroku 1/1688, a ningyo was captured at Nouchi-no-ura., according to the 

About a hundred years before the capture, when a certain apprentice monk from  temple in Tsugaru was faring across the sea towards Matsumae Domain, and fell off the boat. This incident was connected to the fish catch, and when questioned the storytellers confessed they enlarged (embellished) the tall tale.

 Etchū Province ningyo, aka Kairai 
[[File:Ningyo-no-zu-Bunka02-05.jpg|thumb|300px|"Ningyo no zu": A woodblock-printed flier dated 5th month of Bunka 2 (1805).]]
The aforementioned woodblock print from Bunka 2 (1805), entitled "" publicized the appearance of a ningyo also called . It happened on the 5th month of the year, in Yokata-ura, in what is now Toyama Bay.

This ningyo was a creature with head of a long-haired young woman's, a pair of golden horns, a red belly, three eyes on each side of its torso, and a carp-like tail end, according  the text of the flier.
 
While the printed illustration only shows one side of the ningyo, the text itself confirms it had 3 eyes on each side of the body. The feature of eyes on the torso is shared by the prediction beast kudan, also known to have appeared in Etchū Province, and the hakutaku (or baize, of Chinese origin), as scholars have pointed out.

The flier reports that the people grew frightened, and destroyed it with 450 rifles. Yet the flier also states that "A person who views this fish once will enjoy great longevity, avoid bad turns of events and disasters, and gain luck and virtue".

 Edo popular fiction 
 Saikaku 

The ningyo according to Saikaku's reckoning was first washed ashore during Emperor Go-Fukakusa's first era year (1247), and he claims it was remembered as having "a scarlet cockscomb on its head, and a face of a beautiful woman. Four limbs like they were wrought out of jewels, golden-gleaming scales, the flesh most fragrant, and serene voice like the skylark-whistle" according to Ihara Saikaku's  ("Exemplary Tales of the Way of the Warrior", 1674), which features a ningyo as noted above.

The text describes the ningyo as being equipped with four limbs but the illustration draws a mermaid without legs, and having a tail-fin instead; she also is drawn without any cockscomb-like appendage on the head. Another discrepancy is that the samurai named Kinnai had shot the ningyo with a bow (half-bow) according to the text, but the weapon has been swapped with a firearm in the illustration.

 Hakoiri musume 

Santō Kyōden's . is also well known as a work during the Tokugawa era which dealt with the ningyo mermaid topic.

It is an example of work in the genre of kibyōshi or "yellow jacket", and a humorous, satirical piece, whose cast of characters include Urashima Tarō, who has an affair with a carp mistress producing a mermaid daughter in the process. The abandoned mermaid is netted by a fisherman named Heiji. To make ends meet she engages in miuri, i.e., selling herself into prostitution, but her fish-bodied oiran repulses customers. After discovering that licking a mermaid imparts longevity, Heiji opens a mermaid-licking shoppe, gains great wealth, and decides to marry her. She grows out of her outer skin, metamorphosing into a full-fledged woman with both arms and legs. Heiji sells the mermaid's skin slough (nukegara) for profit.

 Two archetypes 

In the mid-Edo period, illustrations of the ningyo consisted of two broad types, as exemplified in illustrated fictional tales.

Where she is depicted as half-human with a pair of arms/hands, examples are readily given from works of fiction writers.

Another is the depiction of a ningyo in the famous work by Bakin, the Nansō Satomi Hakkenden (1814–42), though this work does not centrally revolve around denizens of the sea.

The other type consists of examples where she is depicted as human-headed and armless, as in the case of Kyōden's Hakoiri musume just described (cf. fig., top of page), or the Etchū Province example above.

 Chinese lingyu and chiru 

However this formulation for explaining Chinese origin does not quite succeed, since, as its proponent points out, the Chinese lingyu is actually four-legged, as is the renyu ("human fish") aka tiyu (Japanese:teigyo) and it was the Japanese Wakan sansai zue ("Illustrated Sino-Japanese [Encyclopedia] of the Three Realms", 1712) which for some reason altered the image of the ningyo/renyu  (aka ryōgyo/lingyu ) into a two-armed but legless mermaid.

A different commentator also regards the pictorialization of the ningyo in Wakan sansai zue to be an "addition.. with an illustration.. much like the Western idea of a mermaid".

 Chinese vs. Western sources 

As to the knowledge people held about the ningyo during the Edo Period, the influence of Classical Chinese literature is palpable. Even Kyōden's Hakoiri musume reveals the writer's literacy, as the work discusses the distinction between the  teigyo (Chinese: tiyu) and the geigyo (Chinese:niyu).

Japanese scholars writing on the ningyo drew much from Chinese sources, for example, the Bencao Gangmu (1596), the compendium of Chinese materia medica, which was introduced into Japan in 1607, and was frequently quoted on the subject of the mermaid. Thus Kaibara Ekiken (1709) cited it, and distinguishes the teigyo ("ningyo" in small print) from the geigyo ("salamander").

 Ningyo in Wakan sansai zue 
The influential Wakan sansai zue was modeled after the Three Realms encyclopedia (Sancai Tuhui, 1609) of China, and also drew from such Chinese material on the topic of ningyo. But as already noted the image of the ningyo was not faithful to Chinese sources. ,  and modern Japanese translation, 

 Peixe muller or heiushimureru 
Since the Wakan sansai zue also describes the medical use of peixe muller (Japanese transliteration: heishmure[ru], "woman fish") according to the Dutch, it was using information derived ultimately from a European. However, its claim that the woman-fish bones works as a detoxicant differs from known accounts, and stymies identification of any possible source.

However  and  venture that peixe mulher is more likely Portuguese.}} One identifiable source was the Flemish Jesuit Verbiest aka Nan Huairen (mid-17c.) who wrote in Chinese, cited Ono Ranzan (1803), and possibly even used earlier by Kaibara Ekiken (1709), to describe the effects of the peixe muller medicine.

 Ōtsuki Gentaku 
In the interim, many other European works referring to the siren-mermaid were introduced to the Japanese literati: Johannes Jonston (Latin 1657, Dutch tr. 1660), Ambrose Paré (Œuvres, 1575; Dutch tr. 1593), and François Valentyn (1724–26, in Dutch), thanks to the efforts of 's , who gave translated digests from these works, accompanied by reproductions of siren-mermaid illustrations. And this endeavor was instrumental in forging the image/iconography of the ningyo during the era that was influenced by the European siren-mermaid.

 Mummies or Feejee mermaids 

Specimens of taxidermically crafted ningyo have been observed and illustrated during the Edo Period, including the painting in 'Baien gyofu (cf. below) and the sketch by natural historian  dated Ansei 3/1856.

Baien gyofu 

Mōri Baien's Baien gyofu ('Baien's catalog of fishes', Bunsei 8/1825) contains a full-color hand-painted illustrations of a ningyo in frontal and side views. This has been determined to represent a so-called "stuffed" ningyo crafted by joining the tail-end of a fish, also called a Feejee mermaid in the West.

In popular culture 
 , often incorrectly referred to as Mermen, are a race who appear throughout the entire anime/manga series of One Piece on a regular basis. They look like humans with fish features and are obviously inspired by the ningyo. Fishman is written like ningyo but with the characters switched (人魚, Ningyo -> 魚人, Gyojin).  appear in the series too. These are more peaceful of nature than the Fishmen and, like the mermaids and mermen of folklore, their upper half is that of a human while the lower half is that of a fish, though male Merfolk are somewhat uncommon.
 The manga/anime series Mermaid Saga by Rumiko Takahashi is based on the Yao Bikuni myth, in which the main characters become immortal by consuming the flesh of a mermaid.
 There is a fake "ningyo" in the National Museum of Ethnology.
 The character Serilly from the Puyo Puyo series of games is a lonely ningyo who desires to make friends, but is often paranoid that everyone who approaches her wants to eat her.
 In Okinawa, people have believed that eating ningyo would be unlucky. They also do not eat dugong.
 The character "Ponyo" in the film of the same name is a ningyo or "human-faced fish".
 The primary antagonist of the video game Siren is based on the character Yao Bikuni, and the background of the story is loosely based on the Yao Bikuni legend.
 The 2010 Super Sentai series, Tensou Sentai Goseiger featured the antagonistic cryptid-themed monster group Yuumajuu. One of their members is Jogon of the Ningyo, who has the secondary theme of silverfish.
 The CCG and roleplaying game Legend of the Five Rings has ningyo characters as members of the Mantis Clan.
 The video game Mermaid Swamp is based on the myth of Yao Bikuni and the ningyo myth.
 A host of ningyo characters feature prominently in the manga and anime series Namiuchigiwa no Muromi-san.
 In Yo-kai Watch, Ningyo appears where its English dub name is Mermaidyn. She is depicted as a mermaid who is constantly caught on the hook of Nate Adams' fishing pole much to his annoyance. Yao Bikuni also appears as Mermadonna, who is Mermaidyn's evolved form.
 Bikuni appears in the anime Konohana Kitan as a secondary character.
 The film Lu Over the Wall revolves around an idiosyncratic interpretation of ningyo in which they can manipulate water and turn humans into immortal ningyo by biting them.
 Yaobikuni is a playable character in the mobile RPG Onmyōji.
 Yaobikuni is a character in the manga series Blade of the Immortal.
 Mermaid, a short film by Osamu Tezuka released on September 21, 1964. In a fictional place where using the imagination is banned, a boy saves a fish, which surprises everyone by turning into a mermaid and playing with him. The boy is arrested for imagining this "nonsense", and is robbed of his imagination as punishment. However, he regains this ability and turns himself into a mermaid, so they happily leave forever that totalitarian society to live their eternal love alone in the deep abyss.
 In episode 15 of Vampire Princess Miyu, the action presents a ningyo and a Yao Bikuni as well, where the protagonist (a Vampire) kills the ningyo which is discovered to be a Shinma. The protagonist ignores Yao Bikuni's plea to make her live eternal happy dreams until the end of her life and instead lets her live the next 100 years to experience human suffering.
 In the PC game Return of the Obra Dinn, three Ningyos are captured and held captive by the crew of the ship, causing spider crabs (another Japanese game culture reference) and a giant kraken to attack in retaliation, resulting in the death of several crew members.
 In the PC game Sekiro: Shadows Die Twice, there are 3 Ningyos: one dead at the bottom of the fountainhead palace lake, one alive in the fountainhead palace lake and the Dragon is officially titled in the native Japanese version 'Ningyo Dragon'. There is also an incarnation of Yao Bikuni who is the True/Corrupted Monk whose official title in the native Japanese version of the game is 'Princess Yao'. The game writers directly drew the connection via demonstrating that a parasitic bug that existed in the Ningyo was the reason for the immortality, and this parasite is the cause of the True/Corrupted Monks immortality as well as a significant amount of others in the game.
 In the mobile game Fate/Grand Order, the character Sessyoin Kiara obtains a mermaid-like appearance and powers after having eaten Yao Bikuni.

See also 
 Amabie
 Fiji mermaid
 Jenny Haniver

Explanatory notes

References 
Citations

Bibliography

 
 
 
 
 
 
 
 
 
 
 
 
 
  htm edition
 
 
 
  (Waseda University copy) National Diet Library copy
 
 
 
 
 
  URI

Mermaids
Yōkai
Mythological monsters
Immortality

ja:人魚